Bendazac (or bendazolic acid) is a nonsteroidal anti-inflammatory drug (NSAID) used for joint and muscular pain.

Synthesis
Principal action is inhibition of protein denaturation.

Use of chloroacetamide in the alkylation step, followed by acid hydrolysis produces bendazac (instead of benzydamine).

See also
 Benzydamine

References

Hepatotoxins
Nonsteroidal anti-inflammatory drugs